Elena Livrinikj (born 16 November 1994) is a Macedonian handball player who plays for Gloria Buzău and the Macedonian national team.

References
 

1992 births
Living people
Sportspeople from Skopje
Macedonian female handball players
Expatriate handball players 
Macedonian expatriate sportspeople in Romania